Ramayan Rai is an Indian politician.  He was elected to the Lok Sabha, the lower house of the Parliament of India from the Deoria constituency of Uttar Pradesh as a member of the Indian National Congress.

References

External links
 Official Biographical Sketch in Lok Sabha Website

1932 births
Indian National Congress politicians
Living people